Église Sainte-Marie de Calvi is a church in Calvi, Haute-Corse, Corsica. The building was classified as a Historic Monument in 1988.

References

Churches in Corsica
Monuments historiques of Corsica
Buildings and structures in Haute-Corse